The Nanchao Formation is a Late Cretaceous geologic formation in China. Fossil ornithopod tracks have been reported from the formation. Embryos of therizinosaurs are known from the formation

See also 
 List of dinosaur-bearing rock formations
 List of stratigraphic units with ornithischian tracks
 Ornithopod tracks

References

Bibliography 
 Weishampel, David B.; Dodson, Peter; and Osmólska, Halszka (eds.): The Dinosauria, 2nd, Berkeley: University of California Press. 861 pp. .

Geologic formations of China
Upper Cretaceous Series of Asia
Cretaceous China
Campanian Stage
Santonian Stage
Ichnofossiliferous formations
Paleontology in Henan